Komediehuset på Engen ('Meadow Comedy House') was a historic theatre in Bergen in Norway, active between 1800 and 1909. It was the likely first theatre building in Norway. It housed the Det dramatiske Selskab of Bergen (1800-28), travelling theatre companies (1828-50), the Det norske Theater (Bergen) (1850-63) and Den Nationale Scene (1876-1909), and was finally a concert house and theater museum until it was destroyed in a British bomb raid in 1944.

References
 "Den første nationale Scene i Bergen" (s. 19-28). Folkebladet No. 2. 31te Januar 1900.

Theatres in Norway
19th century in Bergen
Former theatres in Norway
1800 in Norway
1909 in Norway
1800 establishments in Europe
1909 disestablishments in Europe
Theatres completed in 1800
Demolished buildings and structures in Norway